The Crotty Schism took place in the early 19th century, when Father Michael Crotty and his cousin, Father William Crotty, broke away from the Catholic Church to form their own church in Birr, County Offaly, Ireland.

The two fathers began preaching under a divergent doctrine after Michael Crotty was forced from the church where he had been a temporary curate. Michael was able to convince some parishioners who had followed him to construct a new church, which is now used as a store. The schism created was mostly exhausted by 1842. William Crotty eventually joined the Presbyterian Church.

The old church still stands in Castle Street. Known infamously as the site of a 20th-century beerhouse, the prestige of the church has decreased significantly over the years. While certain faithful still attend services occasionally held, most Catholics tend to avoid the historical site.

External links
  More information about the Crotty schism

19th century in Ireland
History of County Offaly
History of Catholicism in Ireland
Religion in Birr, County Offaly
Schisms in Christianity
19th-century Catholicism